Mbo may refer to:
 Mbo language (Cameroon), a language spoken in Cameroon
 Mbo language (Congo), spoken by the Mbo people
 Mbo language (Zambia), a Bantu language of Zambia
 Mbo’ language, a Grassfields language of Cameroon
 Mbo language (Sino-Tibetan), an unclassified Sino-Tibetan language of Tibet

See also
 Mbo (disambiguation)